Daniel Rooseboom de Vries (born 12 August 1980) is a Dutch freestyle footballer from Gorinchem, Netherlands.

In 2008, de Vries came third in the Redbull Street Style Freestyle European Championship in Austria, later reaching that quarter finals of the world finals in Brazil. and South Africa. He even won the national Dutch championships in 2009.

In 2011 he decided to focus more on organising and judging tournaments instead of actually competing . Daniel is the head judge in both the Open World Championships and Red Bull Street Style 2012 and 2013.

Daniel has performed in more than 40 countries, including three cup finals, several TV performances and he is one of the main characters in the Football Freestyle DVD 'CERO2. He even starred in a commercial of software company SAP and is the face of the worldwide Redbull Street Style campaign. In 2012 has got his own character in the video game FIFA street 4. Daniel is also the Head of Digital at  World Freestyle Football Association.

He is sponsored by the Dutch clothing brands Montasoccer and Arise Sportswear.

Throughout the years de Vries has created an own style with signature tricks like the 'clock' where the puts the ball on the side on his head, lies on the floor and walks around like a ticking clock.

Nowadays he lives in Sweden, where he is performing all around the country and he is a well-known street artist in Stockholm as well.

References

External links 
Daniel Rooseboom Official site
SAP Commercial SAP Commercial
Monta Soccer Monta Soccer Freestyle Team
Redbull Street Style Redbull Street Style
Veld6 Interview on Dutch TV channel Veld6 from Brazil
Rixfm Performance on Swedish TV Channel Rixfm

1980 births
Living people
Sportspeople from Gorinchem
Dutch footballers
Dutch expatriates in Sweden
Freestyle footballers
Association footballers not categorized by position